Arthur Morton (22 August 1925 – 1 March  2011) was a professional footballer, who played in 2 FA Cup matches for Huddersfield Town.

References

English footballers
Footballers from Rotherham
Association football defenders
English Football League players
Huddersfield Town A.F.C. players
1925 births
2011 deaths